Franz (Ferenc, François) Kleinberger (8 June 1858 in Budapest - 10 June 1937 in Paris) was a European art dealer. He set up a gallery called F. Kleinberger Galleries at 9 Rue de l’Échelle in Paris, either in January, 1883, or on February 15, 1883, principally involved in selling to US buyers. The year 1848 appears too, but must be wrong, since he was born in 1858. Here is the source for the obviously wrong year of opening his gallery in Paris. By 1913, according another source after the First World War, he had set up a gallery on lower (first at No. 709, then at No. 725) Fifth Avenue in New York, near the Duveen Gallery. Harry S. Sperling took over as the firm's president after Kleinberger's death 1937.

He was the intermediary in the purchase of Fabritius's The Goldfinch by art collector Abraham Bredius for 6,200 francs at the sale of the  Émile Martinet collection on 27 February 1896. Ik liet Kleinb[e]rger op de veiling bieden... de heer zich om, en zegt: "nu zou ik well eens willen weten, wie de kooper is!" "C'est moi", luidde het antwoord. [I let Kleinb[e]rger bid at the auction ... the gentleman turned around and said, "now I would like to know who the buyer is!" "C'est moi" was the answer.]

References

External links

Year of birth missing
19th-century births
1936 deaths
French art dealers